XA, xA, or xa may refer to:

Finance
Athens Stock Exchange, often abbreviated as ΧΑ in Greek

Organizations
 Chi Alpha, a Christian college group
 Golden Dawn (political party), from the Greek initials

Technology

Computing
 X/Open XA, a standard for distributed database transactions
 ".xa". or ".XA", an audio file extensions used in the PlayStation and PSone

 CD-ROM XA, an extension to the CD-ROM storage format
 A Maxis proprietary audio format used by games The Sims and SimCity 3000

Other technologies
 Scion xA, a car
 Fantom-X, a synthesizer made by Roland Corporation
 Olympus XA, a camera

Other 
 Xã, a rural commune, a third-level administrative subdivision in Vietnam
 XA, aircraft registration prefix for Mexican commercial aircraft

See also